Anders Järryd and Gary Muller were the defending champions but only Järryd competed that year with Ronnie Båthman.

Båthman and Järryd won in the final 6–3, 7–5 against Kent Kinnear and Udo Riglewski.

Seeds

  Luke Jensen /  Laurie Warder (quarterfinals)
  Ronnie Båthman /  Anders Järryd (champions)
  Jacco Eltingh /  Tom Kempers (semifinals)
  Kent Kinnear /  Udo Riglewski (final)

Draw

External links
 1992 CA-TennisTrophy Doubles draw

Doubles